Fawn Grove is a borough in York County, Pennsylvania, United States. The population was 476 at the 2020 census. It is served by the South Eastern School District which provides a public education.

Geography
Fawn Grove is located at  (39.730004, -76.450761).

Demographics

At the 2000 census there were 463 people, 182 households, and 139 families living in the borough. The population density was 289.2 people per square mile (111.7/km²). There were 198 housing units at an average density of 123.7 per square mile (47.8/km²).  The racial makeup of the borough was 99.35% White, 0.22% African American, 0.22% Asian, and 0.22% from two or more races. Hispanic or Latino of any race were 1.08%.

Of the 182 households 24.2% had children under the age of 18 living with them, 64.8% were married couples living together, 9.3% had a female householder with no husband present, and 23.1% were non-families. 17.6% of households were one person and 8.8% were one person aged 65 or older. The average household size was 2.54 and the average family size was 2.88.

The age distribution was 19.4% under the age of 18, 9.9% from 18 to 24, 27.2% from 25 to 44, 25.1% from 45 to 64, and 18.4% 65 or older. The median age was 41 years. For every 100 females there were 92.1 males. For every 100 females age 18 and over, there were 92.3 males.

The median household income was $48,750 and the median family income  was $50,714. Males had a median income of $37,500 versus $25,000 for females. The per capita income for the borough was $20,105. About 2.2% of families and 1.1% of the population were below the poverty line, including none of those under age 18 and 5.3% of those age 65 or over.

References

External links

Populated places established in 1763
Boroughs in York County, Pennsylvania
1881 establishments in Pennsylvania